The Statue of Liberty National Monument is a United States National Monument comprising Liberty Island and Ellis Island in the U.S. states of New Jersey and New York. It includes the 1886 Statue of Liberty (Liberty Enlightening the World) by sculptor Frédéric Auguste Bartholdi and the Statue of Liberty Museum, both situated on Liberty Island, as well as the former immigration station at Ellis Island which includes the Ellis Island Immigrant Hospital.

The monument is managed by the National Park Service as part of the National Parks of New York Harbor office.

History
President Calvin Coolidge used his authority under the Antiquities Act to declare the statue a national monument in 1924. In 1937, by proclamation 2250, President Franklin D. Roosevelt expanded the monument to include all of Bedloe's Island, and in 1956, an act of Congress officially renamed it Liberty Island. Ellis Island was made part of the Statue of Liberty National Monument by proclamation of President Lyndon Johnson on May 11, 1965. The United States historic district, a single listing on the U.S. National Register of Historic Places, was designated in 1966.

The islands were closed during Hurricane Sandy in October 2012 and suffered severe damage. Liberty Island reopened July 4, 2013; Ellis Island re-opened October 24, 2013.Storm damage and the necessary repairs for them have heavily affected Ellis Island as hurricanes have become more common in the New York/New Jersey area.

On March 16, 2020 both islands closed due to the COVID-19 pandemic. On July 20, 2020 the Statue of Liberty reopened partially under New York City's Phase IV guidelines, with Ellis Island remaining closed.

Significance
The Statue of Liberty is a world-famous symbol of freedom, given in 1886 by France to the United States in celebration of American Independence. Nearby Ellis Island was the first stop for millions of immigrants to the U.S. in the late 19th and early 20th centuries. The national monument recalls this period of massive immigration to the United States.

Inside the statue, a plaque added in 1903 is engraved with words from "The New Colossus", an 1883 poem by Emma Lazarus:

Location and access

The national monument is located in Upper New York Bay east of Liberty State Park in Jersey City, New Jersey and southwest of Battery Park at the tip of Manhattan in New York City. Entrance is free, but there is a charge for the ferry service that all visitors must use.

In 2007, a concession was granted to Statue Cruises to operate the transportation and ticketing facilities, replacing the Circle Line which had operated the service since 1953. The waters are patrolled by the U.S. Park Police to enforce the restriction on private boat landings. Ferries depart from both parks and all boats stop at both islands, enabling passengers to visit both islands and choose either destination on the return trip.

Tickets can be purchased at Castle Clinton in Battery Park or at the Communipaw Terminal in Liberty State Park. Along with the ferry ticket, visitors intending to enter the statue's pedestal must also obtain a complimentary ticket. Those wishing to climb the 154 stairs to the crown within the statue must obtain a special ticket, which may be reserved up to a year in advance. Ten people per group, three groups per hour, are permitted to ascend, allowing for a total of 240 per day. After an obligatory second security screening, they may bring only medication and cameras, leaving all other items in lockers provided. Visitors intending to tour Ellis Island's south side, namely the Ellis Island Immigrant Hospital, must purchase a "Hard Hat Tour" ticket, which charges an additional fee on top of the regular ferry ticket.

In 2019, the NPS announced that starting on May 16, 2019, tour groups will be banned from certain parts of the Statue of Liberty National Monument, such as the Statue of Liberty's observation deck and the Ellis Island museum. The NPS cited overcrowding for its decision. Although only 1,000 of the site's 24,000 daily visitors travel to the monument within tour groups, the NPS stated that these groups tend to block pedestrian flow within the monument.

Jurisdiction

Liberty Island and Ellis Island have been the property of the United States government since 1800 and 1808, respectively. The dominion, jurisdiction, and sovereignty of the islands have variously been the subject of a colonial land grant, a provincial governor's directive, and an interstate compact, as well as several court cases and a U.S. Supreme Court decision. The result of which is that the natural land masses including Liberty Island and the original acreage on Ellis Island are part of New York City, and the  created by land reclamation at Ellis Island belongs to New Jersey, all surrounded by the municipal borders of Jersey City. Jurisdiction not superseded by the federal government falls to the appropriate state

Superintendents 
Sources:
John Townsley 1965–1967
Henry Schmidt 1967–1970
Jerry Wagers 1970–1971
“Administration supervised by New York District Office from 12/26/1971 to 1/06/1974” Possibly overseen in this time by James Godbolt.
William Hendrickson 1974–1975
Appears to have not been an acting superintendent between Hendrickson and Moffit.
David Moffit 1977–1987
Kevin Buckley 1987–1990
Myra Harrison 1990-1990
Meridith Belkov 1990–1996
Diane Dayson 1996–2003
Cynthia Garrett 2003–2009
David Luchsinger 2009–2013
John Piltzecker 2013–

Related sites
 Battery Park – entrance to the New York ferry to the monument
 Castle Clinton – the New York ticket office
 Liberty State Park – entrance to the New Jersey ferry to the monument
 Communipaw Terminal – the New Jersey ticket office
 Governors Island – another island in New York Harbor
 Governors Island National Monument – a national monument on Governors Island

See also

 Conservation-restoration of the Statue of Liberty
Geography of New York Harbor
Immigration Act of 1924
 List of national monuments of the United States
 National Register of Historic Places listings in Hudson County, New Jersey
 National Register of Historic Places listings in New York County, New York

References

Notes

Further reading
Statue of Liberty:
 PBS documentary about the Statue of Liberty
 American Classic: Lady Liberty – slideshow by Life magazine
 The Statue of Liberty article by Alexandra Kollontay, 1916.
 Historical Information and Photographs
 Gallery Images of the Statue of Liberty

Ellis Island:
 Ellis Island Historical Timeline
 Ellis Island timeline
 Free Search of Ellis Island Database – Port of New York Arrivals 1892–1924
 The Myth of Ellis Island Name Changes

Jurisdiction:
 Supreme Court opinion in New Jersey v. New York (1998)
 National Park Service map showing portions of the island belonging to New York and New Jersey
 American Memory from the Library of Congress

External links

 Statue of Liberty National Monument The official Historical Site handbook.
 Statue of Liberty National Monument Visitor information.

Ellis Island:
 Ellis Island home page
 Ellis Island Immigration Museum
 Ellis Island Visitor information

Monuments and memorials on the National Register of Historic Places in New Jersey
Monuments and memorials on the National Register of Historic Places in New York City
Museums in Hudson County, New Jersey
National Park Service National Monuments in New Jersey
Historic districts in Hudson County, New Jersey

Monuments and memorials in New Jersey
Protected areas established in 1924
History museums in New York City
Protected areas of Hudson County, New Jersey
Port of New York and New Jersey
History museums in New Jersey

Tourist attractions in Jersey City, New Jersey
National Register of Historic Places in Hudson County, New Jersey
New Jersey Register of Historic Places
Buildings and structures on the National Register of Historic Places in Manhattan
National Park Service National Monuments in New York City
1924 establishments in the United States
Monuments and memorials in Manhattan